The Dodge Shadow and Plymouth Sundance are economical 3-door and 5-door hatchbacks that were introduced for the 1987 model year by the Chrysler Corporation. For 1991, a 2-door convertible variant was added to the Shadow lineup; this bodystyle was not offered by Plymouth. The Sundance/Shadow replaced the Omni/Horizon models of their respective marque.

The first vehicle rolled out of Sterling Heights Assembly on August 25, 1986. In late 1988, production of the Mexican market version called the Chrysler Shadow began at Toluca Car Assembly. The Shadow/Sundance was also sold in Europe from 1988 to 1991 as the Chrysler ES. Production ended on March 9, 1994, with the Shadow/Sundance being replaced by the Dodge / Plymouth Neon.

Design
The Shadow/Sundance employed a variant of the K-car platform, the P-body, which was based on a combination of the Dodge Daytona's suspension (alongside some of its interior styling cues) with a shortened version of the Dodge Lancer's body. It had originally been intended as a direct replacement for the earlier Dodge Omni/Plymouth Horizon, but with the economy segment becoming more crowded after the recent introductions of Hyundai (and Yugo) to the US market, Chrysler chose to make the car a bit more substantial. The P platform, being a cut down version of the regular K platform, was also a bit heavier than the competition. The lineup also had more equipment across the board than expected for the class, at least until the 1991 introduction of the stripped-down America model.

While they appeared to have a trunk, it was actually a hatchback. Chrysler considered this a special feature and advertising literature referred to it as "hidden hatchback versatility"; the relatively large storage capacity of these vehicles was a major selling point for the company. The Peugeot 309 which had been developed to replace the European Chrysler Horizon used a similar layout. While mechanically identical, the Sundance and Shadow were differentiated by their front grill, which featured brand consistent designs, Dodge using a crosshair design and Plymouth an "egg crate" design. They also had different tail lamps. In its final year, the Shadow featured the new Dodge rams head emblem on the hood, replacing the corporate pentastar.

In the original lineup, the three-door only Shadow ES was the sportiest model, only available with the turbocharged engine and with wider rims and tires than other models.

Engines
The Shadow/Sundance was offered with a variety of four-cylinder engines, all with displacements of either 2.2 or 2.5 L, some were turbocharged. Naturally aspirated versions were fuel injected, except those sold in Mexico which were carbureted. The engines were tuned for torque rather than horsepower, resulting in horsepower and torque numbers that appear to be reversed from competitors such as the Honda Civic. A Mitsubishi-built 3.0 L V6 engine was added later, replacing the turbocharged engines. All engines were available with a five-speed manual transmission, while a 3-speed automatic was optional on the four cylinder equipped cars and a 4-speed automatic transmission was optional on the V6 powered cars.

Safety
A motorized passenger's side seat belt was added to US-market Shadows/Sundances in 1994, to comply with Federal Motor Vehicle Safety Standard 208's requirement for passive restraints. These motorized seat belts did not comply with Canada's safety standards; Canadian-market Shadows/Sundances continued to use a manual passenger seatbelt, and 1994 Shadows/Sundances cannot legally be imported across the US-Canada border in either direction.

At the time, the Shadow/Sundance was the lowest-priced car on the market with a standard driver's side airbag, which had been made standard on all US-market domestic Chrysler Corporation cars in 1990, giving them a remarkable crash test rating for a car its size at the time.

Production

Year to year changes

 1989 - The Shadow/Sundance received a facelift, with the sealed-beam headlamps discarded in favor of more aerodynamic composite units. All-new grilles and tail lights were among the changes as well.
 1990 - A driver's side airbag was now standard on all models and the manual transmission was modified to make shifting into reverse easier by moving from the "left of first" position to the " below fifth gear" position.
 1991 - A convertible version of the Shadow debuted, the same year the hatchback "base" submodel was split into the entry-level "America" or S (S was used on Canadian market versions) version and mid-level Highline submodels. 
 1992 -  A Mitsubishi-built 3.0 L V6 was added to the lineup, replacing the turbocharged engines.
 1993 - A low pressure Bendix-4 ABS was available.

Options

Features varied over the years, but some features included: power windows, power adjustable mirrors, power door locks, power adjustable driver seat, cruise control, tilt steering wheel, variable intermittent delay windshield wipers, overhead console with map lights and compass/temperature display, upgraded "highline" instrument cluster with tachometer, "light package" that added lighting in the trunk, glove box, under-hood mounted light and rear door dome light switches (4 door models), remote trunk release, rear window defroster, Fog lights, mag wheels, Four wheel disc brakes, Infinity sound system, a cassette player, a sunroof, anti-lock brake systems and on turbocharger equipped cars, there was also a vacuum/boost gauge and a message center that monitored four vehicle functions, door ajar, washer fluid level, etc..

Trim levels
Hatchback:
 Base 1987-1990, 1993-1994
 America/S 1991-1992
 Highline 1991-1992
 ES 1987-1994 (Shadow)
 RS 1988-1991 (Sundance)
 Duster 1992-1994 (Sundance)

Convertible:
 ES 1991-1993
 Highline 1991-1993

Plymouth Sundance

For the Sundance's first year, it was available in a single base model. For 1988, a higher-end RS model was available. The RS model, which stood for Rally Sport, came with standard features that included two-tone paint, fog lights, and a leather-wrapped steering wheel. It was also available with a turbocharged 2.5 L inline-four engine, and other amenities like an Infinity sound system, tinted window glass, and dual power mirrors. For 1991, the base model split into two distinct models: entry-level America and mid-level Highline, in addition to the high-end RS. The stripped-down America had previously been offered for the Plymouth Horizon's final year in 1990.

For 1992, the RS model was dropped, in favor of the revival of the Duster name for a performance version of the Sundance. The Duster featured a 3.0 L V6, special alloy wheels, "Duster" graphics, a body-colored grille & trim, as well as other equipment. Although the Sundance was criticized by some as being a poor choice to bear the "Duster" name, the car offered very good performance and decent handling at a low cost (only about $2,000 more than a base Sundance), which was said to be part of the reason why Chrysler used the "Duster" name, as those were the qualities the original car offered.

For the 1993 model year, the America model was replaced by a better-equipped base model. The Highline would also be dropped for 1993. 

Production Figures:

European market
Between April 1988 and 1991, Chrysler offered the Dodge Shadow in numerous European markets as the Chrysler ES. The ES was based on the Dodge Shadow ES and was relatively the same vehicle, only without the "Shadow" badge. Offered only as a three-door hatchback, the standard engine was the fuel-injected 2.2-liter version, with an optional turbocharger. For 1989, the 2.2 engine was replaced by the larger 2.5-liter unit. Engines were linked to a standard five-speed manual transmission, with a three-speed automatic available as an extra-cost option. As European sales figures turned out to be very poor, sales of the Chrysler ES ended in mid-1991, meaning that Chrysler abandoned the segment in Europe until the 1995 introduction of the Chrysler Neon.

Shelby CSX

Carroll Shelby Enterprises modified Shadows into several performance-oriented vehicles such as the Shelby CSX, which was equipped with a turbocharged 2.2 L engine producing . Because of the car's light weight and powerful engine in an era of government emissions choked engines, it was capable of acceleration equal or greater than that of many contemporary muscle and sports cars.

References

External links

 Allpar Shadow/Sundance section - Dodge Shadow/Plymouth Sundance and Shelby CSX site

Shadow
Compact cars
Convertibles
Hatchbacks
Cars introduced in 1986
1990s cars
Front-wheel-drive sports cars
Cars discontinued in 1994